Vulcain is French for Vulcan.

Vulcain may refer to:

 Vulcain (watch company), a Swiss watch manufacturer established in 1858 and inventor of the alarm complication for wristwatches
 Vulcain (rocket engine), a family of European first-stage engines for the Ariane 5 and Ariane 6
 Vulcain (ship), a number of ships named Vulcain
 Vulcain (M611), part of the French Navy, for sweeping mines
 Vulcain (band), a French heavy metal band
 Vulcain Prize, full name, "Vulcain Prize of the Technical Artist", independent film award for feature films at the Cannes Film Festival official selection rewarding a technician for his collaboration in the creation of a film

See also
 Vulcan (disambiguation)
 La Forge de Vulcain (Vulcan's Forge) is book published in 1973, the third book from Yoko Tsuno comic book series written by Roger Leloup